Petras Poškus (15 December 1935 – 5 January 2004) was a Lithuanian politician.  In 1990 he was among those who signed the Act of the Re-Establishment of the State of Lithuania.

References

External links
 Biography

1935 births
2004 deaths
Lithuanian politicians